Suwat Junboonpha (born August 2, 1992) is a Thai professional footballer who plays as a centre-back for Thai League 2 club Rayong.

References

External links
 at Soccerway

1992 births
Living people
Suwat Junboonpha
Association football defenders
Suwat Junboonpha
Suwat Junboonpha
Suwat Junboonpha